The Jim Thorpe Area School District is located in Carbon County, Pennsylvania, United States. It comprises the borough of Jim Thorpe and the townships of Penn Forest and South Kidder.

According to 2000 federal census data, the school district serves a resident population of 11,428. By 2010, the district's population increased to 15,791 people. The educational attainment levels for the Jim Thorpe Area School District population (25 years old and over) were 87.8% high school graduates and 19.9% college graduates. 

According to the Pennsylvania Budget and Policy Center, 48.9% of Jim Thorpe Area School District's pupils lived at 185% or below the Federal Poverty Level   as shown by their eligibility for the federal free or reduced price school meal programs in 2012. In 2013, the Pennsylvania Department of Education, reported that 19 students in the Jim Thorpe Area School District were homeless. In 2009, Jim Thorpe Area School District residents’ per capita income was $17,444, while the median family income was $42,637. In the Commonwealth, the median family income was $49,501 and the United States median family income was $49,445, in 2010. In Carbon County, the median household income was $48,900, lagging the median US income. By 2013, the median household income in the United States rose to $52,100. In 2014, the median household income in the USA was $53,700.

Jim Thorpe Area School District operates three schools: Lawrence B. Morris Elementary School (Preschool, full-day kindergarten – 8th); Penn Kidder Campus (preK – 8th) and Jim Thorpe Area High School (9th–12th). LB Morris is located in Jim Thorpe. High school students may choose to attend the Carbon Career and Technical Institute for training in the construction and mechanical trades. For the 2014–15 school year, 97 resident students chose to enroll in public, cyber charter schools, rather than attend the district's schools. The Carbon-Lehigh Intermediate Unit IU21 provides the district with a wide variety of services like: specialized education for disabled students; state mandated training on recognizing and reporting child abuse; speech and visual disability services; criminal background check processing for prospective employees and professional development for staff and faculty.

Extracurriculars

Sports
District sports teams include:
Varsity

Boys
Baseball - AAAA
Basketball - AAAA
Cross Country - AA
Football - AAA
Golf - AA
Soccer - AA
Tennis - AA
Track and Field - AAA
Wrestling	- AA

Girls
Basketball - AAA
Cross Country - AA
Soccer (Fall) - AA
Softball - AAA
Girls' Tennis - AA
Track and Field - AA
Volleyball

Junior High School Sports

Boys
Basketball
Cross Country
Football
Track and Field
Wrestling	

Girls
Basketball
Cross Country
Track and Field

References

External links
Official website
Carbon Lehigh Intermediate Unit #21
Carbon Career Technical Institute

School districts in Carbon County, Pennsylvania